The College of Applied Science was established at Kattappana, Kerala, India in 2001.

It is working under (Institute of Human Resource Development) IHRD.

Courses offered
 BSc computer science
 BSc electronics
 MSc computer science

Nearest Railway station	: Kottayam - 125 km 
Nearest Bus Station : Kattappana - 500 M
Nearest Airport : Kochi Airport - 93 km

References

Colleges affiliated to Mahatma Gandhi University, Kerala
Universities and colleges in Idukki district
Educational institutions established in 2001
2001 establishments in Kerala